Lee Suik-Houng (hangul: 이석형) (born January 13, 1971) is a South Korean handball player who is currently playing for Wacker Thun in the Swiss First League of Handball.

In 1997, Lee participated in the World Men's Handball Championship held in Japan, and helped South Korea reach to the quarterfinals. He also competed in the men's tournament at the 2000 Summer Olympics.

References

External links
profile

1971 births
Living people
South Korean expatriate sportspeople in Switzerland
South Korean male handball players
Olympic handball players of South Korea
Handball players at the 2000 Summer Olympics
Asian Games medalists in handball
Handball players at the 1990 Asian Games
Handball players at the 1994 Asian Games
Handball players at the 1998 Asian Games
Asian Games gold medalists for South Korea
Medalists at the 1990 Asian Games
Medalists at the 1994 Asian Games
Medalists at the 1998 Asian Games